Siadenovirus is a genus of viruses, in the family Adenoviridae. Vertebrates serve as natural hosts. There are eight species in this genus.

Taxonomy
The genus contains the following species:
 Frog siadenovirus A
 Great tit siadenovirus A
 Penguin siadenovirus A
 Psittacine siadneovirus D
 Psittacine siadenovirus E
 Raptor siadenovirus A
 Skua siadenovirus A
 Turkey siadenovirus A

Structure
Viruses in Siadenovirus are non-enveloped, with icosahedral geometries, and T=25 symmetry. The diameter is around 90 nm. Genomes are linear and non-segmented, around 35-36kb in length. The genome codes for 25 proteins.

Life cycle
Viral replication is nuclear. Entry into the host cell is achieved by attachment of the viral fiber glycoproteins to host receptors, which mediates endocytosis. Replication follows the DNA strand displacement model. DNA-templated transcription, with some alternative splicing mechanism is the method of transcription. The virus exits the host cell by nuclear envelope breakdown, viroporins, and lysis. Vertebrates serve as the natural host.

References

External links
 Viralzone: Siadenovirus
 ICTV

Adenoviridae
Virus genera